Iztok Utroša (born 1 March 1988) is a Slovenian badminton player. He competed at the 2015 European Games

Achievements

BWF International Challenge/Series 
Men's singles

  BWF International Challenge tournament
  BWF International Series tournament
  BWF Future Series tournament

References

External links 

 

1988 births
Living people
People from Murska Sobota
Slovenian male badminton players
Badminton players at the 2015 European Games
European Games competitors for Slovenia
Competitors at the 2013 Mediterranean Games
Mediterranean Games competitors for Slovenia
21st-century Slovenian people